Federal elections were held in West Germany on 19 November 1972 to elect the members of the 7th Bundestag. In the first snap elections since the resumption of democratic elections in 1949, the Social Democratic Party became the largest party in  parliament for the first time since 1930, winning 230 of the 496 seats. The coalition with the Free Democratic Party was resumed.

Campaign

The Social-liberal coalition of SPD and FDP had lost its majority after several Bundestag MPs (like former FDP ministers Erich Mende and Heinz Starke or SPD partisan Herbert Hupka) had left their party and become members of the CDU/CSU opposition to protest against Chancellor Willy Brandt's Neue Ostpolitik, especially against the de facto recognition of the Oder-Neisse line by the 1970 Treaty of Warsaw.

On 27 April 1972 the opposition had tried to have CDU leader Rainer Barzel elected new chancellor in a motion of no confidence, but Barzel surprisingly missed the majority in the Bundestag by two votes. Rumours that at least one member of CDU/CSU faction had been paid by the East German Stasi intelligence service were confirmed by Markus Wolf, former head of the Hauptverwaltung Aufklärung, in 1997. Nevertheless, the following budget debates revealed that the government's majority was lost and only the upcoming organisation of the 1972 Summer Olympics in Munich delayed the arrangement of new elections. On 22 September 1972 Chancellor Brandt deliberately lost a vote of confidence, allowing President Gustav Heinemann to dissolve the Bundestag the next day.

In the tense campaign, the CDU/CSU attacked Brandt as being too lenient towards Eastern Europe and having the wrong ideas on the economy. SPD and FDP benefited from the enormous personal popularity of the chancellor, laureate of the 1971 Nobel Peace Prize. He gained the support by numerous celebrities of the West German culture and media scene (e.g. Günter Grass), expressed by the slogan Willy wählen! ("Vote for Willy!").

Results
Voter turnout was 91.1%, the highest ever since 1949. In 1970 the voting age had been lowered from 21 to 18.

The SPD celebrated their best result ever, representing the largest faction in the German parliament for the first time since the 1930 Reichstag elections. It enabled the party to nominate Annemarie Renger for President of the Bundestag; she was the first Social Democrat and also the first woman to hold this office.

Results by state

Constituency seats

List seats

Post-election 

On 14 December 1972 the Bundestag MPs of the social-liberal coalition re-elected Willy Brandt chancellor. His Cabinet Brandt II returned to government the next day, again with FDP chairman Walter Scheel as vice-chancellor and foreign minister. Defeated Rainer Barzel resigned as CDU chairman on 9 May 1973; he was succeeded by Helmut Kohl.

On 7 May 1974, Brandt would resign in the course of the Guillaume Affair, after one of his personal aides had been unmasked as a Stasi agent. The coalition continued under his party fellow Helmut Schmidt, while Brandt remained SPD chairman until 1987.

Further reading

Notes

References

External links
 The Federal Returning Officer
 Psephos

Federal elections in Germany
1972 elections in Germany
1972 in West Germany
November 1972 events in Europe